Smokvica Vela is an uninhabited Croatian island in the Adriatic Sea located southeast of Kornat. Lojena Bay is located on the southeast part of the island, exposed to the jugo wind and sheltered from other winds. The northern tip of the island is marked by a lighthouse.

References 

Islands of the Adriatic Sea
Islands of Croatia
Uninhabited islands of Croatia
Landforms of Šibenik-Knin County